Billotte is a surname. Notable people with the surname include:

 Christina Billotte (born 1969), American singer, songwriter, and guitarist
 Gaston Billotte (1875–1940), French Army general
 Pierre Billotte (1906–1992), French Army general and politician, son of Gaston